Clann na nGael GAA club is a Gaelic football club located in the parish of Drimoleague and Drinagh in County Cork, Ireland. It draws its players from the villages of Drimoleague and Drinagh, and the surrounding areas. The club participates in the Carbery (West Cork) division of Cork and operates at Junior A, B and C level in football. It caters for boys and girls from under-eight up to adult level.

History
Clann na nGael GAA Club was founded in 1888, and is one of the oldest clubs in the Carbery Division. In the early days, the club played in 'Walties Field'. Today, Páirc Tagh na Samhna is the home ground of the club.

The club has historically been known by a few titles: The O'Connells, Rock Rovers, Sean Hurleys and St. Finbarrs (Hurling). The Drimoleague and Drinagh club is now known locally as 'The Scorchers'.

Club origins
The first sign that a committee was in operation comes in February 1888. A letter appeared in the "Skibbereen Eagle" protesting to the said Paper’s report of a match between the O’Connell’s club (a Drimoleague-Drinagh combination) and the Geraldine Club (Leap). The letter was signed John J. McCarthy, Hon. Secretary with John Beamish stepping into the vacant position.

There is no other mention of the committee’s members until 3 November 1888 when the full list of officials and committee members is stated in ‘The Eagle’. They were Dr.Eugene Crowley (Treasurer), John Beamish (Secretary), and a committee made up of Messrs John Maloney, John McCarthy, Denis O’Donoghue, Michael McCarthy, John McCarthy, Jeremiah O’Driscoll, Patrick McSweeney, Timothy Dempsey, Jerome Beechinor P.L.G., Wm. Collins P.L.G., and Jeremiah Driscoll.

Although James Fitzgerald is not listed in the above committee, he is credited with introducing organised sports to Drimoleague. He was originally from Bandon but moved to the parish to live with his son in law, Dr. Crowley, in late 1887. Not much is known about James Fitzgerald or his son in law.

1888 first match
Considering that now, Clann na nGael is a Drimoleague–Drinagh team that plays together for the entire parish it is fitting that the first match played was also a Drimoleague-Drinagh combination. The first match played by a team representing the entire parish took place in Drinagh between Drimoleague-Drinagh (O’Connells) and Leap (Geraldines) in Drinagh. The ball was thrown in at 3 o'clock after O’Connells won the toss. The name "O'Connells" was used in connection with the team representing the parish. In the early years of the GAA, many clubs adopted patriotic names to show their nationalistic beliefs and the title was chosen in honour of Daniel O'Connell.

The Scorcher
In 1902, the team was captained by Jack O'Mahony. He was locally known as 'the Scorcher' owing to his hard, low, rasping shot. 'The Scorcher' was a member of a family that lived in Main Street West at the start of the 20th century. He served in the first World War, being seriously injured in Flanders.

20th century
During the 1940s, the Scorchers won three West Cork titles in a row: 1941, 1942 and 1943. In 1942, they reached the county final, but lost to a strong combined services team. Drinagh had their own team at the time as well. Drinagh won the West Cork junior B title in 1950.

The 1950s and 1960s were lean years for the club, except for 1958 when they reached the West Cork final again. They came up against a strong Doheny's side at the time. A major effort was made to revive the fortunes of the club in the 1970s. Most of the emphasis was placed on under age teams. This resulted in the club winning numerous under age titles, and a West Cork Junior B title in 1977.

Following that success, the club again regained its Junior A status. The club had a number of successes throughout the 1980s. They won the 'Little Norah' in 1981 and reached the finals in 1984 and 1988. A first county title was brought to the club by the U16 team in 1985.

21st century
The next county titled was won in 2005, when the U14's won the county title at that grade. The Juniors managed to bring a 1st adult county and Munster title to the club the year after, in 2006, defeating Churchtown and Knockaderry respectively.

The club qualified for both the Junior A & B West Cork championship finals in 2010. The Junior As also competed in the Seandun league (as well as the Carbery league) during the year. In 2011, the Junior As were competing in the Carrigdhoun league as well as the Carbery League. In 2011, it was decided to field a 3rd Junior team.

In 2012, the Junior As reached the semi-finals of the league while the Junior B & D's competed in their respective league finals.

Honours

Munster Championship
 Munster Junior B Club Football Championship (1): 2006

Cork County
 Cork Junior Football Championship (0): (Runners-up in 1942)
 Cork Junior B Football Championship (1): 2006
 Glenville U21 Invitational Cup (2): 2012, 2013

West Cork Championship
 West Cork Junior A Football Championship (4): 1941, 1942, 1943, 1981
 West Cork Junior B Football Championship (3): 1950, 1977, 2006
 West Cork Junior B Hurling Championship (0): (Runners-Up 1943, 1945)
 West Cork Under-21 B Football Championship (2): 1977, 1980
 West Cork Minor B Football Championship (6): 1963, 1974, 1976, 1985, 2008, 2011
 West Cork Minor C Football Championship (1): 2001

West Cork League
 Junior B League (3): 1976, 1999, 2006
 Junior D League (1): 1988
 Minor C League (1): 2001

Ladies Football
 Cork Minor C (0): (Runners-up 2009)
 West Cork Minor C (1): 2009 (Runners-up 2010)

External links
Official Clann na nGael Club website

Gaelic games clubs in County Cork
Gaelic football clubs in County Cork